Dumardari is a remote village of West Bengal.
Dumardari is situated under Bhupatinagar Police Station in Contai Subdivision, Purba Medinipur. 
Dumardari has a population of about 1000. The main occupation of villagers is cultivation.

To view the location of Dumardari in Wikimapia click here

Postal Address 

P.S.: Bhupatinagar.
Dist: Purba Medinipur.
West Bengal.
Pin: 721425

Historical Importance 

Villages in Purba Medinipur district